is a Japanese noodle dish made with seasonal soba or udon noodles. in a hot dashi soup of  or chicken meat and leeks or Welsh onions. On its own,  or simply "nanban" might be used, referring to the onions in the dish.

Overview

It is more expensive when compared to some other soba dishes like tempura soba and tempura seiro soba.

It has been reported that the fatty duck meat used is most delicious in the winter season, and it is also served with seasonal soba which is particularly suited to colder days.

Etymology
The use of duck and scallions is the source of the name. It is said that scallions are referred to after the Nanman, who arrived in Japan during the Edo period and enjoyed eating them to maintain their health. The bulb onion used widely in European cuisine, was difficult to come by in Japan until the Meiji period and so scallions were used instead.

There is also a view that it was called nanban due to being a new dish. In the essay   literary and cultural scholar  states of kamo nanban "Things of custom unusual to the past tend to be called 'nanban'".

In the Kinki region, kamo nanban is called , where "nanba" is a shifted-sound version of "nanban". Also, in Osaka, Welsh onions have been called "nanba" since the Edo period,  having been a famous producer of Welsh onions, but the actual connection is unknown.

History
, eaten with a hot soup based on soy sauce and flaked bonito, became widespread in the middle of the Edo period. The addition of duck and Welsh onions in the manner of kamo nanban is considered to have been started by the  restaurant in the Shibakuro-chō area of Nihonbashi. Kamo nanban using about five one-inch pieces of Welsh onion, cut vertically and fried, then boiled with duck, is said to have met the tastes of the time and thrived.

A speciality of winter."

The consumption of the domestic duck in Japan came about at the end of the Meiji era, before which kamo nanban solely used wild duck.

Ingredients
Domestic duck and wild duck are used. Because natural wild duck is hard to come by, most soba restaurants use cultivated birds. The juicier thigh meat and soft breast meat are used.

In the Taishō period there were instances of rabbit meat being used.  In "I am a cat", there is the expression .

For onions, long Welsh onions which suit duck are used. In some instances, they are only warmed briefly in soup before adding, but frying or roasting in sesame oil is considered to be correct. Cutting into 5 cm round slices is common.

For seasoning, chilli pepper or yuzu are used.

Instant Noodles
In 2003, the 'Acecook' Company released the first kamo nanban instant "cup noodle" as one of their large-portion "super cup" instant noodles.

In 2009, Nissin Foods's released duck stock soba version in their "don hyōei" product.

In the 9th episode of the TV drama series "Kurosagi", the kamo nanban cup noodle eaten by the main character was an original version for the show.

Related dishes

Kamo Nuki
Kamo nanban  "without duck". Enjoyed as a snack dish with alcohol. The duck meat's fragrance adds a characteristic flavour; alcohol is recommended to match the smell and flavor of broiled duck, umami of the dashi and high grade fat of the duck.

Kamo Seiro

Cold, cooked soba eaten with a dipping sauce of duck meat and Welsh onions. It is said to have been conceived of in 1963 at the Ginza Chōji-an  restaurant

Kamo Nanban Udon
Warm udon with duck and Welsh onions.

Tori Nanban
Similar soba dish using chicken instead of duck. Also called kashiwa udon. "Chicken nanban" is an entirely different non-noodle dish with chicken cutlet and onions.

References

Duck dishes
Japanese noodle dishes